VCT may refer to:

 Valorant Champions Tour, an esports tournament series for the video game Valorant
 Variable Cam Timing, an automobile variable valve timing technology developed by Ford
 Venture capital trust
 Victoria Regional Airport (FAA LID: VCT), in Texas
 Vintage Card Traders, an online sports card trading group
 Vintage Carriages Trust, a site carrying a database of Railway Preservation information
 Vinyl composition tile, a finished flooring material 
 Virginia Capital Trail
 Vogel conflict test
 Volts Center Tapped
 Voluntary counseling and testing, for HIV/AIDS
 Volvo Cars Torslanda, near Göteborg, Sweden
 Saint Vincent and the Grenadines (ISO 3166-1:VCT)

See also
 VCM-01, a Vietnamese cruise missile
 N-VCT, Nissan Valve Timing Control System